Haseley Manor is a Grade II-listed English country house in Haseley, Warwickshire, England.

Architecture 

The house was built from 1875 to 1878, to designs by the architect William Young, for Alfred Hewlett, a coal merchant from Lancashire. It has walls of rock-faced stone and plain tile roofs, and is in the Gothic and Elizabethan styles, including a Gothic turret. It has been Grade II listed since January 1987, giving it legal protection from unauthorised alterations or demolition.

Uses 

In 1930, the house was acquired by the Birmingham Society for the Care of Invalid Children, and put to use as a convalescent home and hospital school for girls. It was then purchased by Birmingham Education Authority and, from 1941, became Haseley Hall Residential Open-Air School For Boys, and was used as a children's home and orphanage.

At some subsequent point it was owned by W & T Avery. By the mid-1960s, it was being used as staff college by the British Motor Corporation, and its nationalised successor, British Leyland. It was next used as a business and conference centre.

It was acquired subsequently by Spitfire Bespoke Homes who subdivided and converted it into a number of private residences, completed circa 2018, including thirteen one, two and three-bedroom apartments. An additional nine residences, including three garden villas and five terraced houses, were created in its grounds. The project architects were Lapworth Architects.

References

External links

 Haseley Manor, Warwick – includes aerial footage

1875 establishments in England
Grade II listed buildings in Warwickshire
Grade II listed houses
Houses completed in 1875
Defunct hospitals in England
Hospitals in Warwickshire
Defunct schools in Warwickshire
Birmingham City Council
British Leyland